Robert "Bobby" Butler (born April 26, 1987) is an American professional ice hockey forward. He is currently playing with the Worcester Railers in the ECHL. He formerly played in the National Hockey League (NHL) with the Ottawa Senators, New Jersey Devils, Nashville Predators and Florida Panthers and won the 2011 Calder Cup championship while with the Binghamton Senators.

Playing career

Amateur
As a youth, Butler played in the 2000 Quebec International Pee-Wee Hockey Tournament with the Minuteman Flames minor ice hockey team, and then in the 2001 tournament with the Middlesex Islanders.

Prior to enrolling at the University of New Hampshire (UNH), Butler played three seasons with the Boston Jr. Bruins of the Eastern Junior Hockey League from 2003–2006 and five seasons with Marlborough High School from 2000–2005, making the varsity team as an eighth-grader. During the 2004–05 season, he helped both his high school team and junior team to championship titles. At Marlborough High School (MHS), Butler recorded 284 points in 116 games as well as breaking the school's record in goals scored during his junior year, tallying 58 goals in 25 games. While at MHS, he played for his father, who coached the team for 25 years, retiring in 2011. Butler's MHS hockey point totals are celebrated in a prominent banner at the Navin Rink in Marlborough, which celebrates former MHS players that accumulated more than 100 points during their high school careers. Butler's MHS career point totals are displayed with other outstanding Marlboro High School hockey players such as Shawn O'Malley, R.J. Byrne and Mark Cappadona.

Butler capped a standout four-year college career by being named the New Hampshire Wildcats' co-captain and finishing second among all NCAA Division I players in goals in 2009 – 10, scoring 29 for UNH, earning him a nomination as a finalist for the Hobey Baker Award as the top U.S. college hockey player. The Wildcats went 87–49–17 with him in the lineup and also qualified for the NCAA Tournament all four seasons that he was enrolled at the school. On March 24, 2010, Butler was recognized as the 58th recipient of the Walter Brown Award, which is presented annually to the best American-born college hockey player in New England. He was also selected as Hockey East's Player of the Year, an All-Hockey East First Team honoree, the Hockey East Player of the month for November, the Hockey East scoring champion, a Hockey East Three Stars Award winner and a 2010 Hockey Humanitarian nominee for his efforts in the community. He recorded 61 goals, 60 assists and 88 penalty minutes over his four-year, 153-game collegiate career at New Hampshire.

Professional
On March 29, 2010, he signed a two-year contract with the Ottawa Senators of the National Hockey League. He made his NHL debut with Ottawa on April 1 in a 4–3 shootout win against the Carolina Hurricanes. After attending the 2010 training camp, Butler was assigned to the Binghamton Senators.

Butler scored his first NHL goal against Nikolai Khabibulin of the Edmonton Oilers on February 12, 2011, and recorded his first assist in the same game, on a goal by Milan Michálek.
After spending the remainder of the season in Ottawa and recording 10 goals and 11 assists in 36 games, he was returned to Binghamton where he helped lead the club to a Calder Cup victory, notching 13 goals and 7 assists during the 23 game playoff.

On July 14, 2011, he was rewarded for his solid 2010–11 season with a two-year, one-way contract with the Ottawa Senators. However, Butler responded with a much poorer 2011–12 season than expected, registering only 6 goals and 16 points in 56 games. As a result, in July 2012 the Senators placed Butler on waivers with the intent of buying out his contract. On July 27, 2012, the Senators announced that his contract had been bought out, making Butler a free agent.

On August 9, 2012, Butler signed a one-year, two-way contract with the New Jersey Devils organization. With the 2012 NHL lockout in effect, he was directly assigned to AHL affiliate, the Albany Devils. Upon commencement of the shortened 2012–13 season, Butler was recalled to New Jersey and made his Devils debut against the New York Islanders at the Nassau Veterans Memorial Coliseum on February 3, 2013. Butler scored his only goal with the Devils against the Pittsburgh Penguins on February 9. After registering 2 points in 14 games with the Devils Butler was placed on waivers by the Devils and claimed by the Nashville Predators on March 4, 2013.

On June 14, 2013 he was traded to the Florida Panthers in exchange for T.J. Brennan.

On July 15, 2015, Butler signed his first contract abroad in agreeing to a two-year contract with Swedish club, Modo Hockey of the SHL. However, he parted ways with Modo after one year and then headed to Medveščak Zagreb of the Kontinental Hockey League (KHL), where he started the 2016-17 campaign. In December 2016, after having played in 37 games (six goals, ten assists) for Zagreb, he transferred to fellow KHL outfit Torpedo Nizhny Novgorod.

As a free agent in the following off-season, Butler returned to North America and opted to sign a one-year AHL contract with the Milwaukee Admirals on August 10, 2017. In the 2017–18 season, Butler led the Admirals with 24 goals and finished second with 45 points through 62 games.

He continued his career in the AHL following the conclusion of the season, signing a one-year contract with the Hartford Wolf Pack, affiliate of the New York Rangers, on July 2, 2018.

During his coaching tenure, Butler opted to return to the professional circuit, initially playing a one off appearance with the Worcester Railers of the ECHL on January 2, 2022, earning first-star honours with three points in a 5-3 victory over the Reading Royals. On January 21, 2022, Butler opted to sign a contract for the remainder of the season with the Railers, finishing with 16 points through 20 games.

Coaching career
While in his final two seasons within the AHL, Butler transitioned to coaching in originally performing as the Director of player development with the Boston Junior Bruins from 2017–2019. He ceased his professional career from 2019–2022, performing as the Director of Hockey Operations for the Worcester Jr. Railers and as a NCAA volunteer assistant coach with the Holy Cross.

International play

Butler represented Team USA in the 2013 World Championship with three goals and one assist for four points to help Team USA win the bronze medal.

On January 1, 2018, it was announced that Butler would represent the United States at the 2018 Winter Olympics. He went scoreless over 5 games as Team USA finished in 7th place.

Career statistics

Regular season and playoffs

International

Awards and honors

References

External links
 
 

1987 births
Living people
AHCA Division I men's ice hockey All-Americans
Albany Devils players
American men's ice hockey forwards
Binghamton Senators players
Florida Panthers players
Hartford Wolf Pack players
Ice hockey coaches from Massachusetts
Ice hockey players from Massachusetts
KHL Medveščak Zagreb players
Milwaukee Admirals players
Modo Hockey players
Nashville Predators players
New Hampshire Wildcats men's ice hockey players
New Jersey Devils players
Olympic ice hockey players of the United States
Ice hockey players at the 2018 Winter Olympics
Ottawa Senators players
People from Marlborough, Massachusetts
San Antonio Rampage players
Sportspeople from Middlesex County, Massachusetts
Torpedo Nizhny Novgorod players
Undrafted National Hockey League players
Worcester Railers players